William McCreery (1750March 8, 1814) was a U.S. Representative from Maryland.

Born in the Province of Ulster in the Kingdom of Ireland, McCreery received a limited education and immigrated to the United States in his youth, where he located in Maryland.  He engaged in agricultural pursuits, and was elected as a Democratic-Republican to the Eighth and to the two succeeding Congresses (March 4, 1803 – March 3, 1809).  In Congress, McCreery served as chair of the Committee on Commerce.  After his tenure in Congress, he resumed agricultural pursuits, and also served as a member of the Maryland Senate from September 1811 until his death at his country home, "Clover Hill", near Reisterstown, Baltimore County, Maryland.

References

1750 births
1814 deaths
Maryland state senators
Irish emigrants to the United States (before 1923)
Democratic-Republican Party members of the United States House of Representatives from Maryland